Beaver Creek is a  long 2nd order tributary to Brandywine Creek in New Castle County, Delaware.

Course
Beaver Creek rises about 0.5 miles north-northwest of Elam, Pennsylvania in Delaware County and then flows southwest to join Brandywine Creek about 0.5 miles east of Granoque, Delaware in New Castle County.

Watershed
Beaver Creek drains  of area, receives about 48.0 in/year of precipitation, has a topographic wetness index of 410.33 and is about 43% forested.

See also
List of Delaware rivers

References

Rivers of Delaware
Rivers of New Castle County, Delaware
Tributaries of the Christina River